Escoma Municipality is the fifth municipal section of the Eliodoro Camacho Province in the La Paz Department in Bolivia. It was created on February 6, 2009. Until then this area was part of the Viacha Municipality.  Its seat is Escoma with 576 inhabitants in the year 2001. 

Escoma Municipality is situated in the Altiplano on the western edge of the Cordillera Real. It is bordered to the north-east, north and west by the Puerto Acosta Municipality, to the south by Lake Titicaca, to the south-east by the Puerto Carabuco Municipality and to the east by the Mocomoco Municipality.

Division 
The municipality is divided into four cantons:

Formerly all these cantons which now make up the Escoma Municipality belonged to the Viacha Municipality.

References

External links 
 Population data of Puerto Acosta Municipality in 2001 and map (still including Escoma Canton and Umanata Canton)

Municipalities of La Paz Department (Bolivia)